The Boschke–Boyd House is a Tudor Revival style house in Northeast Portland, Oregon.  It was listed on the National Register of Historic Places in 2005.

It was built around 1910, and is "a fine example of the Tudor/Jacobethan style with Classical interior influences, designed by prominent and prolific architect, Joseph Jacobberger of the firm Jacobberger and Smith."

It was deemed significant for its association with William E. Boyd, the owner and general manager of the Benson Hotel in Portland
for 36 years, who lived in the house for 28 years.

See also
National Register of Historic Places listings in Northeast Portland, Oregon

Notes

References

External links

1911 establishments in Oregon
Houses completed in 1911
Houses on the National Register of Historic Places in Portland, Oregon
Irvington, Portland, Oregon
Joseph Jacobberger buildings
Portland Historic Landmarks